Corby Borough Council was elected every four years. The council was abolished in 2021, with the area becoming part of North Northamptonshire.

Political control
From the first elections to the council in 1973 until its abolition in 2021, political control of the council was held by the following parties:

Leadership
The leaders of the council from 2005 until the council's abolition in 2021 were:

Council elections
1973 Corby District Council election
1976 Corby District Council election (New ward boundaries)
1979 Corby District Council election
1983 Corby District Council election
1987 Corby District Council election
1991 Corby District Council election
1995 Corby Borough Council election
1999 Corby Borough Council election (New ward boundaries)
2003 Corby Borough Council election
2007 Corby Borough Council election (New ward boundaries)
2011 Corby Borough Council election
2015 Corby Borough Council election (New ward boundaries)
The scheduled 2019 elections were cancelled due to the creation of the new North Northamptonshire unitary authority in 2021.

Election results

Borough  result maps

By-election results

1995-1999

1999-2003

2007-2011

2011-2015

2015-2021

References

External links
Corby Borough Council

 
Council elections in Northamptonshire
Corby
District council elections in England